Pechenihy is an urban-type settlement in Chuhuiv Raion, Kharkiv Oblast, Ukraine. It serves as the administrative center of Pechenihy Raion. It hosts the administration of Pechenihy settlement hromada, one of the hromadas of Ukraine. Population: 

Pechenihy is located on the right bank of the Donets.

History 
It was a village in Kharkov Governorate of the Russian Empire. 

In 1825-1890 the village was called Novo-Bilhorod (Novobilhorod, Novobelgorod).

Urban-type settlement since 1957.

In 1958 - 1962 the Pechenihy Reservoir was built just above the settlement, with the dam located in Pechenihy. The reservoir was built to supply water to the city of Kharkiv.

In January 1989 the population was 5466 people. In January 2013 the population was 5045 people.

Until 18 July 2020, Pechenihy was the administrative center of Pechenihy Raion. The raion was abolished in July 2020 as part of the administrative reform of Ukraine, which reduced the number of raions of Kharkiv Oblast to seven. The area of Pechenihy Raion was merged into Chuhuiv Raion.

The capital of Turkish Pecheneg Khanate during 895-1036 was possibly located in the area. As originally described by Omeljan Pritsak The Pečenegs: A Case of Social and Economic Transformation, Berlin, Boston: De Gruyter, 1976., as "The previous center, of the ninth century Pecheneg state (in “Lebedia”) was probably located in the area of the present-day village Pechenihy in the Xarkiv oblast' (Kharkiv), where archaeologists have discovered remnants of a Pecheneg encampment, dated to the ninth century. This village was settled by a Slavic population only in 1622 and, in 1708 became the center of the Pecheneg “sotnja” (Hundred) of the Izjum “Polk” (regiment), and from the 1750s to 1765 it was the center of the Izjum “Hundred” of the Slobodskyj Regiment."

Transportation
Pechenihy is on a paved road connecting Chuhuiv and Velykyi Burluk. There are local roads as well.

The closest railway station is in Chuhuiv, on a railway connecting Kharkiv and Kupiansk.

External links
Печеніги

References

Urban-type settlements in Chuhuiv Raion
Volchansky Uyezd